Temple Lea Houston (August 12, 1860 – August 15, 1905) was an American attorney and politician who served from 1885 to 1889 in the Texas State Senate.  He was the last-born child of Margaret Lea Houston and Sam Houston, the first elected president of the Republic of Texas.

Biography

Temple Lea Houston was the only one of the Houstons' eight children to be born in the Texas governor's residence in Austin. By the time he was seven, both his parents had died. He lived with an older sister and her family in nearby Georgetown, Texas.  At the age of 13, Houston left home to join a cattle drive, and later worked on a riverboat on the Mississippi River. Aided by a friend of his father, he gained an appointment as a page in the U.S. Senate, and worked in Washington, DC, for three years.

Houston returned to Texas in 1877 at the age of 17 to attend the Agricultural and Mechanical College (now Texas A&M University). He transferred to Baylor University in Waco,  where he graduated in 1880 with honors in law and philosophy. He "read the law" with an established firm and was admitted to the bar. He was the youngest attorney in Texas when he opened his practice. That year, he was appointed as the attorney for Brazoria County near Houston, Texas.

In 1882, Houston was appointed as the district attorney of the 35th Judicial District of Texas, which then covered a large part of the Texas Panhandle, based in Mobeetie, Wheeler County.

Houston carried a Colt revolver, which he named "Old Betsy", always strapped to his waist. Some called him "the best shot in the West." He wore buckskin attire from Mexico and a sombrero with a wide brim and a silver eagle. Like his father, he was more than six feet tall. He had gray eyes; his auburn hair was usually shoulder-length. His knowledge of the Bible and classical literature was all-encompassing. He easily commanded the attention of any audience.

Marriage and family
Established in his career, on February 14, 1883, 23-year-old Houston married Laura Cross, the daughter of a planter. They lived near Fort Elliott, which protected the border against American Indians, as well as the important cattle drives. The couple had seven children, only four of whom lived past infancy. His 4 year old daughter, Samantha, died of a fall at the Driskill Hotel in Texas. Her ghost surrounds the haunted folklore behind the painting "Love Letters" which her father had asked a painter to make in memory of his daughter.

Political career

Houston was elected in 1884 to a single term in the Texas State Senate from District 19.

He concentrated his law practice on the Santa Fe railroad (the Atchison, Topeka and Santa Fe Railway). He spoke French and Spanish, as well as seven Indian languages. In 1888, he gave the dedication address for the opening of the Texas State Capitol, which is still in use after several renovations.

Houston participated in the Oklahoma Territory's Land Run of 1893. In 1894, Houston moved his family to the cattle town of Woodward in Oklahoma Territory.  He was legal counsel of the Atchison, Topeka and Santa Fe Railway; its Woodward depot became one of the most important points in the territory for cattle shipping to the East.  Houston became widely known and popular for his courtroom dramatics. He was charged with murder in the shooting of a brother of the outlaw Al Jennings, after an argument in the Cabinet Saloon, and was acquitted.

Houston won a reputation as a brilliant trial lawyer. In 1899, he delivered his "Soiled Dove Plea" in a makeshift courtroom in Woodward's opera house. The argument on behalf of Minnie Stacey, a prostitute who worked at the Dew Drop Inn, became famous for winning her acquittal after ten minutes' consideration by the jury.

Houston had agreed to be a candidate in Oklahoma's first gubernatorial election, but died two years before statehood.

Death

Houston died of a cerebral hemorrhage on August 15, 1905, in Woodward, then still Oklahoma Territory. His wife Laura lived until April 17, 1938. They are buried together at Elmwood Cemetery in Woodward.

Representation in other media
Edna Ferber modeled her main character of Yancey Cravat on Temple Houston in her novel Cimarron (1929).  (The novel was adapted as film versions under the same name, produced in 1931 and 1960.)
Ross Elliott played Houston in "The Reluctant Gun" (1959) episode of the Western anthology series, Death Valley Days.
In the 1960 film Oklahoma Territory, Houston was played by Bill Williams. Gloria Talbott was cast as Ruth Red Hawk, Ted de Corsia as Chief Buffalo Horn, X Brands as Running Cloud, and Walter Sande as Marshal Pete Rosslyn. The film was written by Orville H. Hampton and directed by Edward L. Cahn.
A 1963–1964 NBC/Warner Bros. television series entitled Temple Houston, which aired 26 episodes, was co-produced by actor Jeffrey Hunter, who also played the part of Houston. Temple Houston was placed on the schedule in a matter of six weeks after it was sold by studio boss Jack Webb to the network.

Houston family tree

Notes

References

Further reading
Grace Hunter Adams, Jack Love: Eighty Niner, Traditional, 1988.
James D. Hamlin, The Flamboyant Judge: As Told to J. Evetts Haley and William Curry Holden''' (Canyon, Texas: Palo Duro, 1972).
Sallie B. Harris, Cowmen and Ladies: A History of Hemphill County (Canyon, Texas: Staked Plains, 1977).
Louise B. James, Below Devil's Gap: The Story of Woodward County, Perkins, Okla.: Evans Publications, 1984

Glenn Shirley, Temple Houston: Lawyer with a Gun (Norman: University of Oklahoma Press, 1980).
Bernice Tune, Golden Heritage and Silver Tongue of Temple Lea Houston (Burnet, Texas: Eakin Press, 1981).

External links

Houston Family Papers, 1836–1969 and undated, in the Southwest Collection/Special Collections Library, Texas Tech University
 Beth Ann Doughty, "Houston, Temple", Encyclopedia of Oklahoma History and Culture''

1860 births
1905 deaths
People from Austin, Texas
People from Woodward, Oklahoma
People from Mobeetie, Texas
Baylor University alumni
Democratic Party Texas state senators
County district attorneys in Texas
Texas lawyers
Sam Houston